Moses Prado (fl. 16th and 17th centuries) was a Christian convert to Judaism who lived Marburg, Germany, and Salonica, Greece. His Christian name at birth was Conrad Victor, and he filled the position of professor of the classic languages at the University of Marburg. Finding it impossible to accept the dogma of the Trinity and of the divinity of Jesus, he went, in 1607, to Salonica, where he embraced Judaism, assuming the name of Moses Prado. After a residence of seven years in that city he began to solicit permission from the Duke of Hesse to return to Marburg, where he had left his wife. In a series of letters addressed by him to an old friend at Marburg named Hartmann, Moses justifies himself for embracing Judaism. The truth of Judaism, he declares, is beyond question, since both the Muslims and the Christians are compelled to acknowledge it. He only asks the Duke of Hesse to show himself as tolerant as the sultan, who grants freedom of conscience to every man. The desired permission was refused, and Moses remained at Salonica until his death.

References

http://www.jewishencyclopedia.com/view.jsp?artid=489&letter=P

Converts to Judaism
Academic staff of the University of Marburg
Year of birth unknown
Year of death unknown
German emigrants to Greece